Basongo may refer to 

Basongo, Democratic Republic of the Congo
Basongo Airport
, a Panamanian coaster in service 1965-66